Lambdopsalidae is a family of extinct multituberculate mammals from the Late Paleocene of Asia. They are part of Taeniolabidoidea, a clade otherwise present in the Early Paleocene (and possibly the Late Cretaceous) of North America; lambdopsalids, therefore, probably evolved from a single radiation that spread into Asia from North America in the mid-Paleocene or earlier. They are represented by the genus Lambdopsalis,  Sphenopsalis and Prionessus.

Though they haven't become as large as Taeniolabis, lambdopsalids were still large by multituberculate standards, the largest species weighting around 30 kg. They are notable for their unique dental speciations such as hypsodonty, which seem to imply speciations towards grazing. Lambdopsalis is notable for offering direct evidence of hair and enamel and tooth prism patterns among multituberculates.

Lambdopsalids lived in the final stages of the Paleocene, disappearing around the PETM. They co-existed with a variety of rodent species - in fact, rodents are thought to have first evolved and diversified in Asia -, indicating that there wasn't competition between both groups, having-coexisted together for several million years.

References

Cimolodonts
Eocene extinctions
Paleocene mammals
Prehistoric mammal families